Richard Nowell may refer to:

 Richard Nowell (cricketer) (born 1975), English cricketer
 Richard Nowell (MP) (fl. 1354), English politician
 Richard Nowell, see Pea galaxy#History of discovery